Sanda Toma (born March 17, 1970) is a Romanian sprint canoer who competed from the early 1990s to the early 2000s (decade). Competing in three Summer Olympics, she won a bronze medal in the K-4 500 m event at Sydney in 2000.

Toma also won a bronze medal in the K-2 5000 m event at the 1993 ICF Canoe Sprint World Championships in Copenhagen.

References

1970 births
Canoeists at the 1992 Summer Olympics
Canoeists at the 1996 Summer Olympics
Canoeists at the 2000 Summer Olympics
Living people
Olympic canoeists of Romania
Olympic bronze medalists for Romania
Romanian female canoeists
Olympic medalists in canoeing
ICF Canoe Sprint World Championships medalists in kayak
Medalists at the 2000 Summer Olympics